The 1989 ICF Canoe Slalom World Championships were held on Savage River in Garrett County, Maryland (western part of the state) near Pittsburgh in the United States under the auspices of the International Canoe Federation. It was the 21st edition. It was the first time the championships were held in the United States. Italy won its first ever medal at these championships.

Medal summary

Men's

Canoe

Kayak

Women's

Kayak

Medals table

References
Official results
International Canoe Federation

Icf Canoe Slalom World Championships, 1989
ICF Canoe Slalom World Championships
International sports competitions hosted by the United States
Icf Canoe Slalom World Championships, 1989
Canoeing and kayaking competitions in the United States
Sports competitions in Maryland